John Mellor may refer to:

 Sir John Mellor (judge) (1809–1887), English judge and politician
 John Graham Mellor (1952–2002), English musician who performed as Joe Strummer
 John James Mellor (1830–1916), English industrialist
 Sir John Mellor, 1st Baronet (1862–1929), English lawyer and Treasury Solicitor
 Sir John Mellor, 2nd Baronet (1893–1986), English politician
 John William Mellor (1835–1911), English lawyer
 John Williams Mellor, (born 1928), French-born American economist

See also

 Jack Mellor (footballer, born 1896), English footballer
 Jack Mellor (born 1906), English footballer